The 2000 North Carolina Senate election were held on November 7, 2000 to elect members to all fifty seats in the North Carolina Senate. The election coincided with the elections for other offices including the Presidency, Governorship, U.S. House of Representatives, Council of State, and state house. The primary election was held on May 2, 2000.

Results Summary

Detailed Results

Districts 1-21

District 1
Incumbent Democratic President Pro Tempore Marc Basnight has represented the 1st district since 1985.

District 2
Incumbent Democrat Frank Ballance has represented the 2nd district since 1989.

District 3
Incumbent Democrat Bev Perdue has represented the 3rd district since 1991. Perdue retired to run for Lieutenant Governor. Democrat Scott Thomas won the open seat.

District 4
Incumbent Republican Patrick Ballantine has represented the 4th district since 1995.

District 5
Incumbent Democrat Charles Albertson has represented the 5th district since 1993.

District 6
Incumbent Democrat R.L. "Bob" Martin has represented the 6th district since 1985.

District 7
Incumbent Democrat Luther Jordan has represented the 7th district since 1993.

District 8
Incumbent Democrat John Kerr has represented the 8th district since 1993.

District 9
Incumbent Democrat Edward Warren has represented the 9th district since 1991.

District 10
Incumbent Democratic Senate Majority Leader Roy Cooper has represented the 10th district since 1991. Cooper retired to run for Attorney General. Democrat A.B. Swindell won the open seat.

District 11
Incumbent Democrat Allen Wellons has represented the 11th district since 1997.

District 12
Incumbent Republican Virginia Foxx, who has represented the 12th district since 1995, was re-elected. Incumbent Republican Don East, who has represented the 12th district since 1995, retired. Republican Phil Berger won the open seat.

District 13
Incumbent Democrats Wib Gulley and Jeanne Hopkins Lucas, who have both represented the 13th district since 1993, were re-elected.

District 14
Incumbent Democrats Brad Miller and Eric Miller Reeves, who have both represented the 14th district since 1997, were re-elected.

District 15
Incumbent Democrat Oscar Harris has represented the 15th district since 1999.

District 16
Incumbent Democrats Eleanor Kinnaird and Howard Lee have both represented the 16th district since 1997.

District 17
Incumbent Democrat Aaron Plyler, who has represented the 17th district since 1983, was re-elected. Incumbent Democrat Bill Purcell, who has represented the 17th district since 1997, was also re-elected.

District 18
Incumbent Democrat R. C. Soles Jr. has represented the 18th district and its predecessors since 1977.

District 19
Incumbent Republican Robert G. "Bob" Shaw has represented the 19th district since 1985.

District 20
Incumbent Democrat Linda Garrou, aho has represented the 20th district since 1999, was re-elected. Incumbent Republican Hamilton Horton Jr., who has represented the 20th district since 1995, was also re-elected.

District 21
Incumbent Republican Hugh Webster has represented the 21st district since 1995.

Districts 22-42

District 22
Incumbent Republican Fletcher Hartsell has represented the 22nd district since 1991.

District 23
Incumbent Democrat Jim Phillips Sr., who has represented the 23rd district since 1997, retired. Democrat Cal Cunningham won the open seat.

District 24
Incumbent Democrat Tony Rand has represented the 24th district since 1995.

District 25
Incumbent Democrat David Hoyle has represented the 25th district since 1993.

District 26
Incumbent Republican Austin Allran has represented the 26th district since 1987.

District 27
Incumbent Republicans Kenneth Moore and John Garwood have both represented the 27th district since 1997.

District 28
Incumbent Democrats Steve Metcalf and Charles Newell Carter have both represented the 28th district since 1999.

District 29
Incumbent Democrat Dan Robinson has represented the 29th district since 1999.

District 30
Incumbent Democrat David Weinstein has represented the 30th district since 1997.

District 31
Incumbent Democrat Bill Martin has represented the 31st district since 1983.

District 32
Incumbent Democrat Kay Hagan has represented the 32nd district since 1999.

District 33
Incumbent Democrat Charlie Dannelly has represented the 33rd district since 1995.

District 34
Incumbent Democrat T. L. "Fountain" Odom has represented the 34th district since 1989.

District 35
Incumbent Republican Bob Rucho has represented the 35th district since 1997.

District 36
Incumbent Republican John Carrington has represented the 36th district since 1995.

District 37
Incumbent Democrat Walter Dalton has represented the 37th district since 1997.

District 38
Incumbent Republican Betsy Lane Cochrane has represented the 38th district since 1989. Cochrane retired to run for Lieutenant Governor. Republican Stan Bingham won the open seat.

District 39
Incumbent Republican James Forrester has represented the 39th district since 1991.

District 40
Incumbent Democrat Dan Clodfelter has represented the 40th district since 1999.

District 41
Incumbent Democrat Larry Shaw has represented the 41st district since 1997.

District 42
Incumbent Republican Bob Carpenter has represented the 42nd district and its predecessors since 1989.

References

2000
2000 state legislature elections in the United States
Senate, North Carolina